Bud Spencer & Terence Hill: Slaps and Beans is a side-scrolling beat 'em up game, with some elements of platform and minigames, developed by Trinity Team srls, it is the first official videogame inspired by the Italian duo of actors Bud Spencer and Terence Hill and released first in 2017 for PC and then ported in 2018 also for PlayStation 4, Xbox One and Nintendo Switch.

Plot
The game is a tribute to the films made in the 1970s and 1980s with the duo of actors, in which Bud Spencer and Terence Hill must thwart the diabolical plans of a group led by the evil "Capo". The settings of the game are taken by the filmography of the duo and range from the Wild West, to Miami, to the tropical island in which is set the movie Who Finds a Friend Finds a Treasure.

Gameplay
Bud Spencer & Terence Hill: Slaps And Beans is a side-scrolling beat 'em up game that takes its cue from classics of the genre, such as Double Dragon or Golden Axe, but with advanced combat mechanics aimed at buying combat choreography as much as possible faithful to the fist fights of Bud and Terence. In some moments it will be necessary to use the specific skills of the protagonists (such as Terence's agility and Bud's strength) to overcome obstacles and proceed in the story. The fundamental ingredient of the game are obviously the classic fights of Bud and Terence, but it is enriched by the presence of several mini-games, such as dune buggy races, the car of Watch Out, We're Mad!.

The graphics is made in 90s pixel art. The soundtrack is made up of a sample of effects and many pieces by Oliver Onions, the musical duo composed by the brothers Guido and Maurizio De Angelis who made the soundtracks of most of the films of the couple.

Development
Bud Spencer & Terence Hill: Slaps And Beans is the evolution of Schiaffi&Fagioli, an unofficial playable demo for Windows and macOS published in October 2015, created as part of a game jam between independent Italian programmers dedicated to spaghetti westerns. Bud Spencer & Terence Hill: Slaps And Beans was then made, with the necessary official licenses, thanks to a Kickstarter fundraising campaign conducted between October and December 2016.

Soundtrack

Reception
The aggregated reviews of Bud Spencer & Terence Hill: Slaps and Beans on the Metacritic website gave the game an average score of 63% (based on 10 reviews).

The Italian online newspaper Multiplayer.it praised above all the excellent pixel art graphics, the soundtrack and the variety in the minigames, noting however some flaws and the excessive ease to defeat the bosses.

The Everyeye.it website, noting how difficult it is to approach the video game in an impartial way because "the title of Trinity Team has a beating heart made of nostalgia and precious memories, those recalled by a duo who, straddling Generation X and that of the Millennials, assumed the same popular-cultural importance of the episodes of Kenshiro on Junior TV." However, he praised above all the artistic sector of the production, thanks to the merits of an extraordinarily evocative pixel art and the sound accompaniment composed of some of the most famous Oliver Onions, while complaining about the absence of online co-op and some minigames with a level of challenge at times inconsistent.

References 

2017 video games
IOS games
Windows games
Nintendo Switch games
Android (operating system) games
PlayStation 4 games
Linux games
Terence Hill and Bud Spencer
Xbox One games
Multiplayer and single-player video games
Side-scrolling beat 'em ups
Video games developed in Italy